Husnija Arapović (7 August 1944 – 25 October 2022) was a Bosnian professional player and football manager.

Career
He was the sporting director of Bosnian club Čelik Zenica, where he has also played and managed with.

Arapović died on 25 October 2022, at the age of 78.

Honours

Player
Čelik Zenica
Yugoslav Second League: 1965–66 (West)

St. Gallen
Nationalliga B: 1970–71

References

External links
 Husnija Arapović at Soccerway

1944 births
2022 deaths
Sportspeople from Zenica
Bosniaks of Bosnia and Herzegovina
Yugoslav footballers
Association football midfielders
Yugoslav Second League players 
Yugoslav First League players 
Swiss Challenge League players 
Swiss Super League players
NK Čelik Zenica players
FK Borac Banja Luka players
FC St. Gallen players
FC Winterthur players 
Yugoslav football managers
Bosnia and Herzegovina football managers
Premier League of Bosnia and Herzegovina managers
FC Schaffhausen managers 
FK Rudar Kakanj managers 
NK Čelik Zenica managers
FK Velež Mostar managers
FK Sarajevo managers
NK Travnik managers
NK Vitez managers
Yugoslav expatriate footballers
Yugoslav expatriate football managers
Yugoslav expatriate sportspeople in Switzerland
Expatriate footballers in Switzerland
Expatriate football managers in Switzerland